Abidabad is situated in Baldia Town municipality of Karachi Pakistan. 

There are several ethnic groups, including Maximum Hindko and some pakhtoon, Siraiki, Sindhi, Kashmiris etc

Mostly people belongs to Pakistan Tehreek Insaf and some are Muslim league Noon, Jamat islami , Pakistan Sunni Tehreek and others

Abidabad is home to around 50,000 Hindko(Hazara) speaking people. Which is about 80% of the total population. In the remaining 20 percent, other nations, especially Pakhtuns, Saraikis, and Kashmiris, live. People here are very hospitable. In terms of religion School of thought, Barelvis and Deobandi are in large numbers here.

Neighbourhoods 
 Afridi Colony
 Dhoraji Colony
 Gulshan-e-Ghazi
 Islamnagar
 Ittehad Town
 Muhajir Camp
 Muslim Mujahid Colony
 Nai Abadi
 Naval Colony
 Rasheedabad
 Saeedabad
 Bismillah Chowk
 Delhi Colony 
 Gujrat Colony 
 Kokan Colony
 Mujahid Colony
 Qadri Muhallah
A well known Extra ordinary Standard Shop in Abidabad is Digital Point. In this shop Complete Printing & advertising Solution.

See also 
 City District Government
 Karachi
 Lahore
 Veraval Turk Jamaat

References

Neighbourhoods of Karachi

Abidabad is home to around 50,000 Hindko(Hazara) speaking people. Which is about 80% of the total population. In the remaining 20 percent, other nations, especially Pakhtuns, Saraikis, and Kashmiris, live. People here are very hospitable. In terms of religion School of thought, Barelvis and Deobandi are in large numbers here.